This is a list of the Australian species of the family Coleophoridae. It also acts as an index to the species articles and forms part of the full List of moths of Australia.

Coleophora albiradiata Baldizzone, 1996
Coleophora alcyonipennella (Kollar, 1832)
Coleophora consumpta Baldizzone, 1996
Coleophora crypsineura (Lower, 1900)
Coleophora horakae Baldizzone, 1996
Coleophora frustrata Baldizzone, 1996
Coleophora fuscosquamata Baldizzone, 1996
Coleophora leucocephala Baldizzone, 1996
Coleophora nielseni Baldizzone, 1996
Coleophora rustica Baldizzone, 1996
Coleophora seminalis Meyrick, 1921
Coleophora serinipennella Christoph, 1872
Coleophora tremefacta Meyrick, 1921
Corythangela fimbriata Baldizzone, 1996
Corythangela galeata Meyrick, 1897

External links 
Coleophoridae at Australian Faunal Directory

Australia